Aakash Sangwan (born 28 October 1995) is an Indian professional footballer who plays as a left-back for Indian Super League club Chennaiyin.

Career
Sangwan is a product of the Minerva Punjab youth system when they were known as Minerva Academy. Sangwan then stayed with Minerva Punjab when they were promoted to the I-League and made his professional debut for the club on 30 April 2017 against DSK Shivajians. He started the match and played 41 minutes as Minerva Punjab drew the match 4–4.

The next season, Sangwan scored his first professional goal against Aizawl on 26 February 2018. His 51st-minute strike was the first in a 2–0 victory which brought Minerva Punjab to the top of the I-League table. The club would eventually go on to confirm their championship, Sangwan's first of his professional career.

Sangwan made his first professional appearance for RoundGlass Punjab on 9 January 2021 against Aizawl FC.

Career statistics

Club

Honours
Minerva Punjab
I-League: 2017–18

References

1995 births
Living people
People from Jind
Indian footballers
Footballers from Haryana
Association football fullbacks
I-League players
Churchill Brothers FC Goa players
RoundGlass Punjab FC players